The 2010 Supertaça Cândido de Oliveira was the 32nd edition of the Supertaça Cândido de Oliveira, the annual Portuguese football season-opening match contested by the winners of the previous season's top league and cup competitions (or cup runner-up in case the league- and cup-winning club is the same). It took place on 7 August 2010 at the Estádio Municipal de Aveiro in Aveiro, and was contested between Benfica, the 2009–10 Primeira Liga winners, and Porto, the 2009–10 Taça de Portugal winners.

Played in front of a crowd of 28,000, the Dragões defeated the Águias 2–0. Goals in either half from central defender Rolando and Radamel Falcao saw Porto defeat the Portuguese champions Benfica and thus raise the club's tally to 17 trophies in this competition.

Match

Details

References

Supertaça Cândido de Oliveira
2010–11 in Portuguese football
Sport in Aveiro, Portugal
FC Porto matches
S.L. Benfica matches